William Allan Bardeen (born September 15, 1941 in Washington, Pennsylvania) is an American theoretical physicist at Fermi National Accelerator Laboratory.  He is the son of John Bardeen and Jane Maxwell Bardeen.

Biography
After graduating from Cornell University in 1962, Bardeen earned his Ph.D. Degree in Physics from the University of Minnesota in 1968. Following research appointments at Stony Brook University and the Institute for Advanced Study in Princeton, he was an Assistant and Associate Professor in the Physics Department at Stanford University. In 1975, Bardeen joined the staff of Fermi National Accelerator Laboratory where he has served as Head of the Theoretical Physics Department. From 1993 to 1994, he was Head of Theoretical Physics at the SSC Laboratory before its termination.

Bardeen is co-inventor of the theory of the axial vector current anomaly which is of foundational importance in modern theoretical physics. He developed with Stephen L. Adler the "non-renormalization theorem" (known as the Adler–Bardeen theorem). He has played a major role in the development of perturbation theory for quantum chromodynamics, and dynamical approaches to electroweak symmetry breaking. Bardeen is considered one of the leading authorities on quantum field theory and its application to the phenomena of elementary particle physics.

He was elected a Fellow of the American Physical Society in 1984. In 1985, Bardeen was awarded a John S. Guggenheim Memorial Foundation Fellowship for research on the application of quantum field theory to elementary particle physics. Previously, he had received the Senior Scientist Award of the Alexander von Humboldt Foundation and an Alfred P. Sloan Foundation Fellowship for research in theoretical physics. Bardeen was awarded the 1996 J.J. Sakurai Prize of the American Physical Society for his work on anomalies and perturbative quantum chromodynamics. He was elected a Fellow of the American Academy of Arts and Sciences in 1998 and a member of the National Academy of Sciences in 1999.

See also
 Anomaly
 Topcolor

Selected publications
 Bardeen's publications are available on the INSPIRE-HEP Literature Database .

Notes

External links
arXiv.org preprints for W. Bardeen
search on author William Bardeen from Google Scholar

Cornell University alumni
University of Minnesota College of Science and Engineering alumni
21st-century American physicists
Living people
1941 births
Fellows of the American Academy of Arts and Sciences
Fellows of the American Physical Society
Theoretical physicists
Members of the United States National Academy of Sciences
J. J. Sakurai Prize for Theoretical Particle Physics recipients
Sloan Research Fellows
Institute for Advanced Study visiting scholars
People associated with Fermilab